Astrida Tumba Vicente (born 1978) is an Angolan basketball player. At the 2012 Summer Olympics, she competed for the Angola women's national basketball team in the women's event. She is 5 ft 8 inches tall.

References

External links
 

Angolan women's basketball players
1978 births
Living people
People from Moxico Province
Olympic basketball players of Angola
Basketball players at the 2012 Summer Olympics
C.D. Primeiro de Agosto women's basketball players
G.D. Interclube women's basketball players
Shooting guards
African Games silver medalists for Angola
African Games medalists in basketball
Competitors at the 2007 All-Africa Games